Duane Rowe is a former Australian rules footballer, who played for the Fitzroy Football Club in the Victorian Football League (VFL).

Career
Rowe played for Fitzroy in the 1986 season, before leaving, and then returning in 1989. He then left again in 1992, and never returned to the VFL.

References

External links

Fitzroy Football Club players
1966 births
Living people
Australian rules footballers from Victoria (Australia)